Aingdo is a village in the Mandalay Region of north-west Myanmar. It lies in Pyawbwe Township in the Yamethin District.

See also
List of cities, towns and villages in Burma: A

References

Populated places in Mandalay Region